The Lahn Saddle (el. 1,006 m.) is a high mountain pass in the Austrian Alps between the Bundesländer of Lower Austria and Styria.

It is traversed by Federal Highway B 23.

It connects the Salza river valley from Mariazell with the Mürz river valley.

The southeast side has a maximum grade of 11 percent. The west side from Terz im Halltal has a maximum grade of 17 percent. Three kilometres away is the peak of the Göller massif (1766 m.), with the Wildalpe in the south.

The town of Lahnsattel (1 km east of the pass) has lost one fifth of its population in recent times.

See also
 List of highest paved roads in Europe
 List of mountain passes

Mountain passes of the Alps
Mountain passes of Lower Austria
Mountain passes of Styria
Mürzsteg Alps